Sé quién eres (English: I Know Who You Are) is a single-season, 16-episode Spanish television drama series created by Pau Freixas for Telecinco. It premiered on January 16, 2017 and stars Blanca Portillo, Francesc Garrido, Carles Francino, Eva Santolaria and Aida Folch. The series was given the highest rating for TV fiction in 2017 by the WIT at MIPTV. The series was shot in Barcelona and its metropolitan area.

Plot 
The series revolves around Juan Elías, a prestigious lawyer who suffers a complete loss of memory after what seems to be a car crash. With the help of his wife, Judge Alicia Castro, he tries to reconstruct the events when the vehicle is found; but things take a darker turn when traces of the blood of Ana Saura, a niece of Juan who has been missing for days, are found in it. Ana's father, Ramón, tries to prove Juan has killed her and hires a private legal firm which includes a female lawyer Eva Duran who was the lover of Juan Elias. The series is based in Barcelona, contains many descriptions of the Spanish legal system and concentrates on the bonds of love, friendship and family.

Cast

Main

Secondary/guest

List of episodes

International broadcast 
On April 9, 2017, the series premiered in Poland on Ale Kino+ under the title Wiem, kim jesteś (I Know Who You Are). In the United Kingdom the BBC  acquired the rights to air the series under the title I Know Who You Are. The first ten episodes series premiered on July 15, 2017 on BBC Four and finished in September 2017.  The final six episodes were shown in November 2017. In The Netherlands, a remake was created under the title Ik weet wie je bent (I Know Who You Are), for the Dutch public broadcaster KRO-NCRV on NPO 3. The first episode aired on 26 August 2018.

References

External links 

Telecinco network series
2010s Spanish drama television series
2017 Spanish television series debuts
2017 Spanish television series endings
Fiction about amnesia
Spanish thriller television series
Television shows filmed in Spain
Psychological thriller television series